Chrysogonum is a genus of flowering plants in the family Asteraceae found only in eastern North America.  Confusion regarding species that were named in Chrysogonum from other parts of the world, such as Madagascar, was clarified by Stuessy  who reduced the genus to having only a single species with two varieties.  A similar treatment was proposed by Nesom, although in that treatment 3 varieties were accepted. The plants are low-growing terrestrial herbs with yellow flower heads containing both disc florets and ray florets. The genus is distinctive in having pistillate ray florets and staminate disk florets, and the pistil of the ray floret is fused to the adjacent phyllary as well as 3 paleae and their associated disk florets to form a "cypsela complex". The species is grown as an ornamental plant under the common name of Green and Gold, and is used primarily as a ground cover.

 Species

 Chrysogonum virginianum L. - eastern United States

References

Heliantheae
Asteraceae genera